The Ruch catalog of postage stamps of Poland, officially titled Ilustrowany Katalog Znaczków Polskich, contained detailed information on Polish postage stamps, and was published on a yearly basis.

The purpose of the catalog was to describe postage stamps related to the country of Poland and to estimate their value in the philatelic market at the time of publication.

Publisher 

The catalog was published in Warsaw, Poland, by Agencja Wydawnicza “Ruch”.

Format 

The catalog contains black and white illustrations of polish stamps, cancellations, and overprints. Value of individual stamps is listed in Polish currency. The entire catalog is written in Polish.

Content 

The catalog covers the full extent of Polish philately and is comprehensive in the following categories.
 Postage stamps of Poland
 City locals
 Austrian occupation
 German occupation
 Military mail
 Exile stamps
 Propaganda stamps
 Post-wartime overprints
 Prisoner-of-war
 Displaced persons
 Postal stationery
 Plebiscite issues
 Port Gdansk
 Cinderellas
 Charity stamps

In addition, the catalog provides detailed information on counterfeit stamps, cancellations and overprints, such as porto and groszy, plus information that is not found or described in depth in other philatelic catalogs, such as Fischer catalog.

Availability 

A current edition of the catalog may no longer be available. However, previous yearly editions provide a valuable historic and philatelic resource.

See also
 Stamp catalog
 List of stamp catalogues
 Philately

References

 Ilustrowany katalog znaczków polskich, 1973.
 Ilustrowany katalog znaczków polskich, 1983.
 Glossaire philatélique
 The Atlanta Stamp Collectors Club Library

Philately of Poland
Stamp catalogs